Alex Highsmith (born August 7, 1997) is an American football outside linebacker for the Pittsburgh Steelers of the National Football League (NFL). He played college football at Charlotte.

Early life and high school
Highsmith grew up in Wilmington, North Carolina and attended Eugene Ashley High School, where he played baseball, basketball and football. He played middle linebacker and fullback and was named second-team All-Area and first-team All-Mideastern Conference as a senior. He was also named All-Area in baseball. Highsmith was lightly recruited by college programs and only received interest from Davidson and Furman before being offered a spot on UNC Charlotte's team as a walk on.

College career
Highsmith joined the Charlotte 49ers as a walk-on and redshirted his true freshman season. As a redshirt freshman, he played in all 12 of the 49ers games and finished the season with 17 tackles and a sack. Highsmith was a key member of Charlotte's defensive line rotation during his redshirt sophomore season and finished the year with 33 tackles with 5.0 tackles for loss, 2.0 sacks and one fumble recovery. He was named a starter at defensive end as a redshirt junior and was named first-team All-Conference USA after setting a school record with 17.5 tackles for loss along with 60 total tackles, three sacks and two forced fumbles. He was again named first-team All-Conference USA and was also a third-team All-America selection by the Associated Press as a senior after setting new school records with 14 sacks and 21.5 tackles for loss.

College statistics

Source:

Professional career

Pittsburgh Steelers 
Highsmith was drafted by the Pittsburgh Steelers in the third round, 102nd overall, of the 2020 NFL Draft.

2020
In Week 8 against the Baltimore Ravens, Highsmith recorded his first career interception off a pass thrown by Lamar Jackson during the 28–24 win.
In Week 9 against the Dallas Cowboys, Highsmith recorded his first career sack on Garrett Gilbert during the 24–19 win. 
In Week 13 against the Washington Football Team, Highsmith made his starting debut. In it, he recorded five tackles in the Steelers first loss of the season. Highsmith would finish the remaining four games as the Steelers' starter, recording 23 more tackles as well as 1 sack that he recorded during their season finale against the Cleveland Browns.

2022
In Week 10, Highsmith had five tackles, two sacks, a tackle for loss and a forced fumble in a 20–10 win over the New Orleans Saints, earning AFC Defensive Player of the Week.

He finished the 2022 Season with 63 tackles, a team high 14.5 sacks, and league leading five forced fumbles.

NFL career statistics

Personal life
Highsmith is a Christian. Highsmith is married to Alyssa Ungrady.

References

External links
Charlotte 49ers bio

1997 births
Living people
Players of American football from North Carolina
Sportspeople from Wilmington, North Carolina
American football defensive ends
American football linebackers
Charlotte 49ers football players
Pittsburgh Steelers players